Eat 'Em and Smile is the debut studio album by former Van Halen singer David Lee Roth, released on July 7, 1986, after his unpredicted successful debut EP Crazy from the Heat (1985).

History
After releasing Crazy from the Heat, an EP of lounge standards that became a surprise hit during early 1985, and subsequently parting ways with Van Halen while the band was at its commercial zenith, Roth assembled a new backing band: bassist Billy Sheehan (later of Mr. Big); drummer Gregg Bissonette (later of Ringo Starr's All-Star Band); and virtuoso guitarist Steve Vai, who had played with Frank Zappa, PiL, and Alcatrazz.

Both a critical and commercial success, Eat 'Em and Smile was praised by Rolling Stone: "No song on the album was as slick as any of the singles from Van Halen's '5150' album" (which featured Roth's replacement, Sammy Hagar) and also opined that Eat 'Em and Smile was much more "trashy fun". Indeed, many of the reviews of Eat 'Em and Smile compared it directly with Van Halen's synth-heavy 5150, often favorably.

The extensive North American Eat 'Em and Smile Tour ran from mid-1986 through early 1987.

The phrase 'Eat ‘Em and Smile' was part of a trademark registered in 1928 by the now-defunct Ward-Owsley Co candy company in Aberdeen, South Dakota.

In 2015, a live concert for the 30th anniversary reunion was planned featuring Vai, Sheehan, Bissonette, and keyboardist Brett Tuggle. Initially Michael Starr was going to sing, but David Lee Roth at last minute was present at the avenue. Due to safety measures and the overwhelmed capacity of the venue, the fire marshals shut down the show.

Production
Two of the album's original songs became its biggest hits. "Yankee Rose", a tongue-in-cheek tribute to the Statue of Liberty, became an MTV and radio hit, rising into the Billboard Top 20. The would-be theme to Roth's then-planned movie, "Goin' Crazy!", also became an MTV staple that reached #66 on Billboards Hot 100 in October 1986.

Similar to his preceding EP, Roth included two lounge song covers on Eat 'Em and Smile: "That's Life", which was a minor hit at the end of 1986 and "I'm Easy"; a third cover was John D. Loudermilk's folk-blues song "Tobacco Road", and Billy Sheehan brought in "Shy Boy". The remainder of the songs were written by Roth and Vai.

A version of "Kids in Action", originally by Kim Mitchell (of Max Webster), was also recorded for the album. Billy Sheehan was briefly a member of Max Webster, and according to Kim Mitchell: "it didn’t work out. There were no hard feelings and he went on and did really well. I got a call from him one day and he goes 'Hey man I'm in the studio with David Lee Roth, Ted Templeman and Steve Vai and we're covering your tune 'Kids in Action' and we need the words to the second verse'. I was shaking on the phone; this was right after Roth left Van Halen. Then at the last minute it got bumped off the record for 'Tobacco Road'."  There is no known studio version of Roth's cover available to the public.

This was the first of two Roth albums to feature the duo of Steve Vai and Billy Sheehan on guitar and bass respectively. Throughout the album the two would often sync complicated basslines and lead guitar parts, as on tracks such as "Shyboy" and "Elephant Gun". The album brought Steve Vai into the public eye as a contender with Eddie Van Halen, the previous guitarist who worked with Roth. This album features some of Steve Vai's most renowned guitar work.

Sonrisa Salvaje
Sonrisa Salvaje (literally "Wild Smile") is the Spanish-language version of Eat 'Em and Smile. According to the Van Halen Encyclopedia, the idea to re-record the album in Spanish was the idea of bassist Billy Sheehan, who had read an article in a magazine which reported that over half the Mexican population was between the ages of 18–27, a prime record buying market. Roth re-cut all his vocals with the help of a Spanish tutor in the studio. He edited some of risqué lyrics, so as not to offend the more conservative Spanish-speaking population. With the exception of the vocals, the basic music tracks are the same as the Eat 'Em and Smile version, with the only exception being "Big Trouble", which ends abruptly as opposed to fading out on the English version.

According to Sheehan, the album wasn't well-received, with many people considering it "gringo Spanish". Any future Spanish-version ideas were dropped. Sonrisa Salvaje was originally released on vinyl and cassette, but deleted almost immediately; a CD version did not appear until 2007. All of the liner notes on the original release were written in Spanish, except for the copyright notice and the Dolby noise reduction information on the cassette version.

Critical reception
Daniel Brogan of the Chicago Tribune found the album to be a "manic spree" where Steve Vai's "stinging guitar work" is the most appealing component. Terry Atkinson of the Los Angeles Times wrote, "And the Ted Templeman-produced "Eat 'Em," which stands up well alongside the best Van Halen albums, features the Roth you know: rock's answer to those pop-eyed libidinous wolves of the old Tex Avery cartoons." Eat 'Em and Smile was named "album of the year" by Kerrang! for 1986.

Track listing
Instead of the typical "A Side" and "B Side", the vinyl artwork showed the track listing on one side of the disc, as the A Side had a photograph of Roth in-costume.

Personnel
 David Lee Roth – vocals, backing vocals
 Steve Vai – guitars, horn arrangement on 3
 Billy Sheehan – bass, backing vocals on 2, 3, 5, and 6
 Gregg Bissonette – drums, backing vocals on 3

Additional personnel
 Jeff Bova – keyboards on 1
 Jesse Harms – keyboards on 5
 Sammy Figueroa – percussion on 5
 The Waters Family – backing vocals on 10
 The Sidney Sharp Strings – strings on 10
 Jimmie Haskell – horn and string arrangement on 10

Charts

Weekly charts

Year-end charts

Certifications

References

Further reading

David Lee Roth albums
1986 debut albums
Albums arranged by Jimmie Haskell
Albums produced by Ted Templeman
Warner Records albums
Glam metal albums